Cameron Stafford (born 1992) is a squash player in the Caribbean Region. He was the reigning Cayman Islands Junior Open Champion. He trained for the 2010 Commonwealth Games in India, representing the Cayman Islands. Stafford was an Under 13 Caribbean Tennis Champion in 2002, also winning the Florida Open for the U-15 Category in 2003. He is now a coach for Squash players of all ages and can sometimes be found competing in local tournaments in Grand Cayman.

U-17 Junior Squash Championships
2007– "12th place in the Canadian Junior Open Squash Championships"
2007– "2nd place in the 25th Caribbean Junior Squash Championships"
2007 – Bronze Plate finalist in the British Junior Open (England)
2008 – 4th place in the South Sound Squash Club Championships (Cayman Islands)
2008 – 1st place in the Caribbean Squash Championships U17 (Bermuda)
2008 – 1st place in the Cayman Islands Junior Open (Cayman Islands)
2009 – 2nd place in the Caribbean Junior Squash Championships U19 (Barbados)
2010 – 2nd place in the Cayman Open (Cayman Islands)
2010 – 1st place in the Cayman Islands Junior Nationals (Cayman Islands)
2010 – 1st place in the Caribbean Junior Squash Championships U19 (Cayman Islands)

Tournament participation 
2010 – CAC Games (Bogotá, Colombia)
2010 – World Junior Squash Championships (Quito, Ecuador)
2010 – Caribbean Senior Squash Championships (St. Vincent)
2010 – Commonwealth Games (India)

References

"Cayman Capers" Retrieved on 2008-06-5
 "25th Caribbean Junior Squash Championships 2007" Stafford Stuns Ross by Shane Slater. Retrieved on 2008-06-5
 "25th Caribbean Junior Squash Championships 2007"  Team Result 1. Retrieved on 2008-06-5
 "25th Caribbean Junior Squash Championships 2007" Team Results 2. Retrieved on 2008-06-5
 "25th Caribbean Junior Squash Championships 2007" Team Results 3. Retrieved on 2008-06-5
 "25th Caribbean Junior Squash Championships 2007" Team Results 4. Retrieved on 2008-06-5
 "25th Caribbean Junior Squash Championships 2007" Draws. Retrieved on 2008-06-5

1992 births
Living people
Squash players at the 2010 Commonwealth Games
Squash players at the 2014 Commonwealth Games
Squash players at the 2018 Commonwealth Games
Commonwealth Games competitors for the Cayman Islands